Janina Niedźwiecka  (20 January 1922, Irkutsk, Russia – 17 December 2004, Poland) was a Polish film editor.

Niedźwiecka edited award-winning films such as Palace and Journey to Arabia at the Gdynia Film Festival in 1980. She was the winner of the Chairman of the Committee of Radio and Television degree in 1975 for editing for the series Nights and Days.

References

External links

1922 births
2004 deaths
People from Irkutsk
Polish film editors
Women film editors
Soviet emigrants to Poland